Jonathan Lucas Hunt  (born 2 December 1938) is a New Zealand politician, and was New Zealand's High Commissioner to the United Kingdom from 2005 to March 2008. He formerly served as Speaker of the New Zealand House of Representatives. He is a member of the Labour Party, and was until his retirement in 2005 the longest-serving MP in Parliament. Hunt is a member of the Order of New Zealand, New Zealand's highest civilian honour. Hunt was given the nickname the "Minister for Wine and Cheese" after his well-known liking of the combo.

Early life
Hunt was born in Lower Hutt, but grew up in Palmerston North. He had a twin brother, David, who died four days after they were born. Hunt's father was a child welfare officer, reassigned to the Manawatu in 1942. Hunt was educated at Palmerston North Boys' High School and later Auckland Grammar School; later he enrolled at the University of Auckland, where he gained a BA (Hons) degree in history.

In 1958, Hunt was elected editor of the Auckland University Students' Association's (AUSA) Craccum magazine for the 1959 year. While at University Hunt is also credited with founding the Princes Street Labour branch. He was a 'radio quiz kid' and in 1963 he toured South-East Asia with a Rotary group of Young New Zealanders.

After graduating, Hunt became a History, English and Latin teacher from 1961 to 1966 at Kelston Boys High School in West Auckland where he also coached cricket. He was then a university tutor. Hunt also has a long-standing relationship with the Department of Political Studies at the University, which for many years has collected and archived Hunt's personal and professional papers. Hunt lived in Karekare on Auckland's west coast and he was well known for his passionate interest in the sport of cricket. He was the secretary of the Auckland Secondary Schools' Cricket Association.

Member of Parliament

In 1966, Hunt was elected to Parliament in Auckland's New Lynn electorate replacing the retiring Rex Mason, whom Hunt was to later write a biography of in the Dictionary of New Zealand Biography.

In mid-January 1970, United States Vice President Spiro Agnew visited Wellington. Hunt along with several other Labour Members of Parliament including Bob Tizard, Arthur Faulkner, and Martyn Finlay boycotted the state dinner to protest American policy in Vietnam. However, other Labour MPs including Opposition Leader Norman Kirk attended the function which dealt with the Nixon Doctrine.

He was later promoted further in 1974 by Prime Minister Bill Rowling to the position of Chairman of Committees. As Chairman of Committees he had the responsibility of deputising for the Speaker of the House of Representatives, the 67 year old Stan Whitehead. Whitehead was in ill-health and Hunt acted on his behalf more than he had expected to. When Whitehead suffered a heart attack in the last parliamentary session of 1975 Hunt was nearly drafted to replace him as Speaker, though Whitehead was to make a recovery.

After the shock defeat of the Rowling government, Hunt was appointed to Rowling's shadow cabinet and designated as Shadow Minister of Health in 1976. He left the shadow cabinet, at his own request, in 1979 with the intention of setting himself up to become Speaker of the House should Labour win the next election. Labour did not win and in the next parliamentary term he was senior whip and Shadow Minister of Broadcasting.

Cabinet Minister
During the Fourth Labour Government he served as Postmaster-General, Minister of Broadcasting, Minister of Tourism and Minister of Housing. He had chaired the caucus committee on restructuring the broadcasting industry in 1973 which was uncompleted. However, on becoming Minister of Broadcasting in 1984 he stated the idea would not be resurrected but reaffirmed his intention to fulfil Labour's manifesto commitments to establish a Maori and Pacific Island radio station, ban commercials on the concert and national radio programmes and aiding the establishment of privately owned television stations. After the 1987 election the cabinet was reshuffled in which he lost the broadcasting and Postmaster-General portfolios and designated Leader of the House. This left him without a department to administer which saw his salary reduced by $19,200 per annum, leading to opposition leader Jim Bolger to label Hunt's position as "sinecure", much to Hunt's displeasure. He eventually was given extra portfolios of tourism, housing and broadcasting during the course of the term.

During the divisions of the Fourth Labour Government's second term Hunt generally supported Prime Minister David Lange over the finance minister Roger Douglas. In 1989, Prime Minister Geoffrey Palmer nominated Hunt a member of the Privy Council in recognition of his long service to Parliament.

Upon the retirement of Sir Robert Muldoon, Hunt was the longest-serving member of Parliament between 1991 and 2005, earning him the unofficial title of 'Father of the House'. He assumed the title of 'father' to the delight of colleagues given his status as a lifelong bachelor.

In opposition again from 1990, Hunt was senior opposition whip, Shadow Leader of the House and Shadow Minister of Housing under leader Mike Moore. Hunt supported Helen Clark in her successful leadership bid against Moore, after which he remained senior whip and Shadow Leader of the House.

Speaker of the House of Representatives
He was elected Speaker unopposed when the fifth Labour government came to power in 1999. Hunt had previously served as Chairman of Committees from 1974 to 1975 which had since been rebranded as the Deputy-Speaker. Hunt became the eighth Chairman of Committees to later serve as Speaker. He retained his position following the election in 2002 serving in total as Speaker for six years from 1999–2005.

High Commissioner to the United Kingdom
In December 2004, it was announced that he would retire from politics and replace Russell Marshall as New Zealand High Commissioner in London, a move that had long been anticipated. He was replaced as Speaker by Margaret Wilson on 3 March 2005, and left Parliament on 30 March. As a list MP, his vacant parliamentary seat was filled by the next available candidate on the Labour Party list, Lesley Soper.

Some controversy arose in mid-2005, when recently after he arrived in London, Hunt was told publicly by the New Zealand Prime Minister Helen Clark that he could not apply for the U.K pension as it was not appropriate given his position of New Zealand High Commissioner and the fact that he was already collecting a New Zealand parliamentary pension.

On 21 November 2007 the New Zealand Foreign Minister, Winston Peters, announced that the next High Commissioner to London would be Derek Leask from March 2008.

Personal life

Hunt is the patron of the University of Auckland Debating Society. He is a lifelong enthusiast for the sport of cricket and was an administrator for the sport for many years.

Honours
In 1977, Hunt was awarded the Queen Elizabeth II Silver Jubilee Medal, and in 1990 he received the New Zealand 1990 Commemoration Medal. In the 2005 New Year Honours, Hunt was appointed as a Member of the Order of New Zealand.

Documentary
Hunt was also the subject of a documentary, "Father of the House", directed by Simon Burgin and Xavier Forde, which was filmed in Wellington in 2005. The film was a finalist in the DocNZ film festival in the same year. It has also been regularly screened on the Documentary Channel on Sky Television since 2006.

Notes

References

Works cited

|-

|-

|-

|-

|-

|-

|-

|-

|-

|-

|-

|-

|-

1938 births
Living people
Members of the Order of New Zealand
New Zealand members of the Privy Council of the United Kingdom
New Zealand Labour Party MPs
Ministers of Housing (New Zealand)
Members of the New Zealand House of Representatives
Speakers of the New Zealand House of Representatives
University of Auckland alumni
People from Lower Hutt
People educated at Auckland Grammar School
People educated at Palmerston North Boys' High School
New Zealand list MPs
High Commissioners of New Zealand to the United Kingdom
21st-century New Zealand politicians